Keiran Zac Murtagh (born 29 October 1988) is a footballer who represents Dartford and Antigua and Barbuda at international level.

Club career
Murtagh joined Conference South side Fisher Athletic in November 2007, in his only season at the London club in a season where he made 21 appearances and scored one goal. He was made Fisher's young player of the year for the 2007–08 season. Murtagh was much sought-after at the end of 2007–08, having impressed many with his performances for Fisher Athletic.

Even though he had trials for Premier League and Championship clubs, Fulham and Nottingham Forest respectively, he signed for League One club Yeovil. After being tracked he was finally signed on a two-year contract, on 12 June 2008. He made his debut for Yeovil Town as a substitute in the 1–1 home draw against Walsall, on 9 August 2008. In his first season with Yeovil he made 26 appearances.

Murtagh scored his first goal, with a thirty-yard strike, against Huddersfield in a 2–1 defeat 29 August 2009. He was offered a new contract on 13 May 2010, but rejected it in favour of a move to Wycombe Wanderers where he signed a one-year contract.

On 31 January 2011, Murtagh signed a one-month loan deal with Conference South club Woking, subsequently extended for a further month. He was recalled to his parent club on 23 March to provide cover in their midfield.

On 10 June 2011, Murtagh signed a two-year deal with Conference National side Cambridge United.

On 29 December 2011, it was announced that Murtagh would join former club Woking on loan until the end of the season.

After leaving Cambridge United, Murtagh spent the 2012–13 season at Macclesfield Town before moving on to play for League two side Mansfield Town. However, he was unable to make regular appearance in the starting lineup and midway through the 2013–14 season, came back down to Woking on loan for a third spell.

Once his contract ended at Mansfield Town, Murtagh signed a permanent contract with The Cards for the 2014–15 season.

On 9 June 2017, he signed for Boreham Wood on a two-year deal.

On 13 June 2021, Murtagh signed for Dartford.

International career
Murtagh represented the Republic of Ireland U17 side while playing for Charlton Athletic.

On 25 November 2010, Murtagh was called up to the Antigua and Barbuda squad for the 2010 Caribbean Championship. He made his debut in the 3–1 defeat against Jamaica on 27 November.

Career statistics

Club

International

International goals
As of match played 7 June 2016. Antigua and Barbuda score listed first, score column indicates score after each Murtagh goal.

References

External links

1988 births
Living people
Footballers from Wapping
English sportspeople of Antigua and Barbuda descent
English people of Irish descent
English footballers
Black British sportsmen
Antigua and Barbuda footballers
Antigua and Barbuda international footballers
Association football midfielders
Fisher Athletic F.C. players
Yeovil Town F.C. players
Wycombe Wanderers F.C. players
Woking F.C. players
Cambridge United F.C. players
Macclesfield Town F.C. players
English Football League players
National League (English football) players
Republic of Ireland youth international footballers
2014 Caribbean Cup players
Mansfield Town F.C. players
Boreham Wood F.C. players
Dartford F.C. players